Buko is a 2022 Czech comedy drama film starring Anna Cónová. Directed and written by Alice Nellis, it tells story of a search and need for freedom on a farm. The title role was played by eponymous domestic horse. The film premiered on 7 July 2022 at the 56th Karlovy Vary International Film Festival. Cinemart released the film in theatres on 29 September 2022.

Synopse
Jarmila is dealing with a dilemma: She has to face a decision on how to deal with the end of her life. She can spend it either as a patient waiting for the end or with a personal rebellion in the form of a quite unexpected adventure. Retired circus horse named Buko unexpectedly enters her life and this change for Jarmila represents a step towards the desired mental freedom.

Cast
 Anna Cónová as Jarmila Šestáková
 Miroslav Krobot as Antonín Šesták, Jarmila's husband
 Petra Špalková as Tamara, Jarmila's daughter
 Jan Cina as Tomáš, Jarmila's son
 Martha Issová as Tereza, autistic librarian
 Lenka Termerová as Tereza's mother
 Martin Kubačák as Karel, farmer
 Jana Oľhová as Karel's mother
 Martin Šulík
 Filip Menzel
 Marian Roden

References

External links
 
2022 comedy-drama films
2022 films
2020s Czech-language films
Czech comedy-drama films
Films about autism
Films about horses
Films set on farms